Kamidia Radisti  (born in Surabaya, East Java, February 23, 1984) is an Indonesian actress, model, and beauty pageant titleholder who winner of the 2007 Miss Indonesia title. She represented the province of West Java. She competed against 32 other finalists to win the title. She also represented Indonesia at Miss World 2007 but unplaced.

In 2008, Radisti made an appearance as a host in a national TV program. She also appeared in horror movies such as, The Shaman in 2008, and Hantu Biang Kerok (released on February 19, 2009).

Miss Indonesia's CROWN
Kamidia Radisti is successor incumbent at 5 July 2007 - 13 May 2008 (only 1 year hold the crown) and her crown is given to Miss Indonesia 2008.

Filmography 
 The Shaman (2008)
 Hantu Biang Kerok (2009)
 The Tarix Jabrix 3 (2011)
 Sang Pialang (2012)

References

External links 
 Profil di Cineplex
 Profil di Kapanlagi

1984 births
Indonesian beauty pageant winners
Indonesian film actresses
Living people
Miss Indonesia winners
Miss World 2007 delegates
People from Surabaya
People from Bandung
Sundanese people